Khaled Sharrouf (born 23 February 1981) was an Jihadist who in 2013 travelled to Syrian territory to fight in the Syrian Civil War on the side of Islamic State of Iraq and the Levant (ISIL, also known as Islamic State). Born in Sydney, Australia, in 2017 he was the first Australian dual-national to have his Australian citizenship revoked under anti-terror legislation passed in 2015. In 2014, he posted an image to the Internet showing his seven-year-old son holding the severed head of a Syrian soldier, an act that was widely condemned.

He was reportedly killed in June 2015, and again in August 2017, but his death has remained unverified.

Early life
Growing up in the 1980s, Sharrouf had a dysfunctional childhood, reportedly living a troubled youth filled with crime and mental illness. He was abandoned by his father for a period. During his teens, he both used and dealt drugs. He did not grow up as a practising Muslim. Jamal Rifi, a local GP, said that Sharrouf was initially diagnosed as having depression, but later believed that it was schizophrenia.

Imam Sheikh Taj El-Din Hilaly described Sharrouf "as an empty vase, which could be filled with anything, and it was filled with rubbish ideology."

In 2005, he was arrested at his home in Wiley Park along with eight others during an Australian anti-terror investigation code-named Operation Pendennis. He was imprisoned for four years and released on parole in 2009 after a judge and psychiatrist "cautiously believed" that he would "abandon his radical beliefs."

Sharrouf was involved in planning the 2012 Sydney protests regarding the film Innocence of Muslims.

In Syria

Sharrouf travelled from Sydney Airport to ISIL-controlled territory on 6 December 2013 using his brother's passport. He later joined the group in 2014. His activities received wide coverage in Australia in August 2014 after he posted a photo of his son holding a severed head. The incident was condemned by Australian leaders and by the public. The incident raised concerns about Australian Muslims being recruited for terrorist activity abroad, and the possibility that the recruits would return to Australia and conduct attacks.

Sharrouf was reported to have been killed on 19 June 2015 by a drone strike. His death was not confirmed, and later reports suggested that he was still alive. The Australian government was unable to confirm his death.

With Mohamed Elomar, Sharrouf posted photographs of severed heads or dead and mutilated bodies.

In February 2017, he was the first person to have his Australian citizenship revoked under new anti-terror laws passed in 2015.

On 11 August 2017, he was reported to have been killed by a coalition airstrike while driving near Raqqa, Syria, along with two of his sons. When questioned, the Department of Immigration and Border Protection Minister Peter Dutton said that Sharrouf's death would be nothing to mourn.

Personal life 
Sharrouf was married to Tara Nettleton, an Australian woman. In 2014 she brought to the Islamic State their five children: |Zaynab, Hoda, Abdullah, Zarqawi and Hamzah. In 2015, it was reported that Nettleton wanted to return with her five children to Australia. According to a family friend, Nettleton died in 2015, which her mother, Karen Nettleton, learned about January 2016. Nettleton is believed to have died in Syria following complications from appendix surgery.
 
The two oldest boys, Abdullah and Zarqawi, began attending IS training camps. They reportedly died with their father in the 2017 Raqqa airstrike. Sharrouf's eldest daughter Zaynab was married to an ISIL jihadist at 13 years old and gave birth to a child at 14 years old. The father was Mohamed Elomar, an Australian ISIS fighter and friend of her father. After Elomar was killed in an airstrike around 2015, Zaynab remarried another friend of her father and had another child. After the children were orphaned, they fled Zaynab's husband in Baghouz in March 2019. In April 2019, the Sharrouf children were reunited with their Australian grandmother in a camp in Syria, expressing the urge to return to Australia. The Australian prime minister Scott Morrison at the time said such an extraction was too dangerous, while the Australian Opposition Leader Bill Shorten called for the children to be allowed home.

On June 24, 2019, it was reported that eight Australian children had been evacuated from a Syrian refugee camp, including three orphaned children of Khaled Sharrouf. The Australian government evacuated the children secretly while working with aid groups. The eldest child, Zaynab, had two children of her own, also evacuated. Zaynab Sharrouf was also heavily pregnant at the time of the rescue, which took place on June 23 at 4:30 pm Australian Eastern Standard Time in Northern Syria. It was the "first organised return of Australians from the conflict zone." At the time, The Australian said that around 70 Australians were in refugee camps or detention centers in northern Syria. Around 50 were women and children, many "sick and injured." Officials said they would be psychologically analyzed before being brought to Australia and repatriated.

External links
“The ruins of Raqqa” , a 2018 documentary produced by the Australian Broadcasting Corporation and distributed by Deutsche Welle's  DW-TV, which in part follows reporter Matt Brown interviewing residents of Syria and Iraq who encountered Sharrouf and his family, including Yazidi women held as slaves who served the family

References

1981 births
Lebanese Islamists
Australian people of Lebanese descent
Possibly living people
People who lost Australian citizenship
Islamic State of Iraq and the Levant members from Australia
Arab slave owners
Lebanese prisoners and detainees